Alan Hardwick Windle (born 20 June 1942) FRS is a British material scientist, and Chair of Materials Science at Cambridge University.

He earned a BSc from Imperial College London, and a PhD from University of Cambridge.
He was a lecturer in materials science from 1975 to 1992, and Fellow of Trinity College, Cambridge. In 1997 he was elected a Fellow of the Royal Society.

Works
A First Course in Crystallography 1978
Liquid Crystalline Polymers with Prof A M Donald, 1992; with Dr S Hanna and Prof A M Donald, 2006

References

External links
http://www.msm.cam.ac.uk/department/material_eyes.php
https://web.archive.org/web/20120406033938/http://www.msm.cam.ac.uk/polymer/pub.html

1942 births
British materials scientists
Alumni of Imperial College London
Alumni of Trinity College, Cambridge
Fellows of Trinity College, Cambridge
Fellows of the Royal Society
Living people